John Corrigan "Jonathan" Wells (born 1942) is an American author, theologian, and advocate of the pseudoscientific argument of intelligent design. Wells joined the Unification Church in 1974, and subsequently wrote that the teachings of church founder Sun Myung Moon, his own studies at the Unification Theological Seminary and his prayers convinced him to devote his life to "destroying Darwinism." The term Darwinism is often used by intelligent design proponents and other creationists to refer to the scientific consensus on evolution. He gained a PhD in religious studies at Yale University in 1986, then became Director of the Unification Church's inter-religious outreach organization in New York City. In 1989, he studied at the University of California, Berkeley, where he earned a PhD in molecular and cellular biology in 1994. He became a member of several scientific associations and has published in academic journals.

In his book Icons of Evolution: Science or Myth? (2000), Wells argues that a number of examples used to illustrate biology textbooks were grossly exaggerated, distorted truth, or were patently false. Wells said that this shows that evolution conflicts with the evidence, and so argued against its teaching in public education. Some reviewers of Icons of Evolution have said that Wells misquoted experts cited as sources and took minor issues out of context, basing his argument on a flawed syllogism. Wells's views on evolution have been rejected by the scientific community.

Biography
Wells was born in New York City in 1942 and grew up in New Jersey, and was brought up as a Protestant Christian. He studied geology at Princeton University, where he dropped out in his junior year. Following a brief stint as a taxi driver, he was drafted into the United States Army and spent two years serving in Germany. After his discharge in 1966, he attended University of California, Berkeley, where he publicly refused to report for reserve duty. This resulted in him being arrested and being incarcerated for eighteen months at the Leavenworth military prison. Upon his release, Wells returned to Berkeley where he completed his studies with a major in geology and physics and a minor in biology.

In 1974, Wells joined the Unification Church of the United States. He graduated from the church's Unification Theological Seminary in 1978 with a master's degree in religious education. Wells continued his studies at Yale University, earning a PhD in religious studies in 1986, focusing on historical reactions to Darwinism. During this time he wrote extensively on Unification theology and taught at the Unification Theological Seminary. Wells was on the Board of Trustees of the Unification Theological Seminary until resigning in 1997 to return to teaching. He also acted as the director of the International Religious Foundation, a Unification Church affiliated organization which sponsors interdenominational conferences.

Wells has written on the subject of marriage within the Unification Church and has been called a "Unification Church marriage expert" by church sources. Wells defended Unification Church theology against what he said were unfair criticisms made in 1977 by the National Council of Churches.

In 1994, Wells earned another PhD in molecular and cellular biology at UC Berkeley. After receiving his doctorate, he worked at a position he described as "a post-doctoral research biologist at Berkeley, writing articles critical of Darwinism." Shortly after that Wells joined former UC Berkeley law professor Phillip E. Johnson, father of the intelligent design movement, at the Discovery Institute. He now serves as a fellow at the Discovery Institute's Center for Science and Culture, the hub of the intelligent design movement, and at the International Society for Complexity, Information, and Design, which also promotes intelligent design.

Wells appeared on a panel at Harvard with Stephen Palumbi in November 2001, which his supporters lauded as a "home run". Other observers stated that Wells' performance was "uneventful".

Opposition to Darwinian evolution

Of his student days at Unification Theological Seminary (1976–78), Wells said, "One of the things that Father [Reverend Sun Myung Moon] advised us to do at UTS was to pray to seek God's plan for our lives." Wells later described that plan: "To defend and articulate Unification theology especially in relation to Darwinian evolution."

Wells stated that his religious doctoral studies at Yale, which were paid for by the Unification Church, focused on the "root of the conflict between Darwinian evolution and Christian doctrine" and encompassed the whole of Christian theology within a focus of Darwinian controversies. He said:

Wells said that "destroying Darwinism" was his motive for studying Christian theology at Yale and going on to seek his second PhD at Berkeley, studying biology and in particular embryology:

Wells's statement and others like it are viewed by the scientific community as evidence that Wells lacks proper scientific objectivity and mischaracterizes evolution by ignoring and misrepresenting the evidence supporting it while pursuing an agenda promoting notions supporting his religious beliefs in its place.

He has written articles for the Discovery Institute, WorldNetDaily, Origins & Design, and other sympathetic publications attacking evolution and defending intelligent design. In 1997, he presented a paper entitled "Evolution by Design" at the Unification Church sponsored International Conference on the Unity of the Sciences in Washington, D.C.

In 1999, Wells debated with the New Mexicans for Science and Reason. He was one of the contributors to Natural History magazine's 2002 debate between intelligent design advocates and evolution supporters. In 2005, he debated Massimo Pigliucci on the PBS talk show Uncommon Knowledge. Pigliucci said that Wells "clearly lied" during his debates and misrepresented his agenda and science, as well as not understanding some of the theories he tried to attack.

Wells is one of the signatories of the Discovery Institute's "A Scientific Dissent From Darwinism," a petition which the intelligent design movement uses to promote intelligent design by attempting to cast doubt on evolution. He is also the author of "Ten questions to ask your biology teacher about evolution" for high school students, which is published by the Discovery Institute. The National Center for Science Education has issued a list of answers to the questions.

Icons of Evolution

Wells is best known for his 2000 book Icons of Evolution, in which he discusses 10 examples which he says show that many of the most commonly accepted arguments supporting evolution are invalid. The book is rejected by many members of the  scientific community and has received much criticism by those opposed to his views. There have been 12 detailed reviews of Icons, from scholars familiar with the subject matter, which have come to the consensus that the book's claims are a politically motivated extreme exaggeration and misrepresentation of a scattering of minor issues.  Scholars quoted in the work have accused Wells of purposely misquoting them and misleading readers. Biology Professor Jerry Coyne wrote of Icons, "Wells's book rests entirely on a flawed syllogism: ... textbooks illustrate evolution with examples; these examples are sometimes presented in incorrect or misleading ways; therefore evolution is a fiction."

Kansas evolution hearings

In 2005, Wells participated in the Kansas evolution hearings, which were boycotted by mainstream scientists. There Wells testified:
 

Prior to the evolution hearings, in December 2000 after the Pratt County, Kansas, school board revised its tenth-grade biology curriculum at the urging of intelligent design proponents to include material that encourages students to question the theory of evolution, The Pratt Tribune published a letter from  Jerry Coyne challenging Wells's characterization in an article of his work on peppered moths, saying that his article appended to the Pratt standards was misused and being mischaracterized:

The Politically Incorrect Guide to Darwinism and Intelligent Design
In 2006, Wells published his second major book, The Politically Incorrect Guide to Darwinism and Intelligent Design, which was part of a series published by Regnery Publishing. The book was praised by Tom Bethell, author of The Politically Incorrect Guide to Science (2005), but was described by Reed A. Cartwright of The Panda's Thumb weblog as being "not only politically incorrect but incorrect in most other ways as well: scientifically, logically, historically, legally, academically, and morally." Cartwright also edited a chapter-by-chapter critique of the book. A quote from the book linking evolution to eugenics, abortion and racism appeared on Starbucks paper cups in 2007.

HIV/AIDS denialism 

In 1991, Wells and his mentor Phillip E. Johnson signed an open letter which said in full:

Wells and Johnson have been criticized, along with others, for their questioning of the scientific and medical consensus that HIV causes AIDS.  In the Washington University Law Review, Matthew J. Brauer, Barbara Forrest, and Steven G. Gey faulted Wells, Johnson, and others for denying the HIV/AIDS connection and promoting denialism via a petition designed to garner publicity but which did not have any scientific support.

Publications

Articles in peer-reviewed journals

Books

Dissertations
Wells, John Corrigan. 1986. CHARLES HODGE'S CRITIQUE OF DARWINISM: THE ARGUMENT TO DESIGN (EVOLUTION, THEOLOGY). Ph.D. Dissertation, Yale University, 265 pages.

Wells, John Corrigan. 1994. A confocal microscopy study of microtubule arrays involved in cortical rotation during the first cell cycle of Xenopus embryos. Ph.D. Dissertation, University of California, Berkeley, 124 pages.

See also
Unification Church and science

Notes

References

External links 

 Jonathan Wells biography from the Discovery Institute
Articles by Wells from the Discovery Institute
 Articles by Wells from the Access Research Network
 "Icons of Evolution FAQs" from talk.origins
 Wells's testimony at the Kansas evolution hearings
 "Icons of Evolution? – Why much of what Jonathan Wells writes about evolution is wrong" by Alan D. Gishlick
 "10 Answers to Jonathan Wells's '10 Questions'" from National Center for Science Education
 Chapter by chapter analysis of Wells's The Politically Incorrect Guide to Darwinism and Intelligent Design by Reed A. Cartwright, The Panda's Thumb

Intelligent design advocates
Fellows of the International Society for Complexity, Information, and Design
American Unificationists
Unification Theological Seminary graduates
Discovery Institute fellows and advisors
HIV/AIDS denialists
UC Berkeley College of Letters and Science alumni
1942 births
Living people
Pseudoscientific biologists
20th-century American writers
21st-century American writers
Yale University alumni